Sarah-Yvonne Prytula (born 3 May 1984 in Sydney) is an Australian former competitive figure skater who competed in ladies' singles. At the Australian Championships, she won one silver and four bronze medals. She appeared at five Four Continents Championships and the 2000 World Championships.

Programs

Results 
JGP: Junior Grand Prix

References

External links

1984 births
Australian female single skaters
Figure skaters from Sydney
Living people
Competitors at the 2005 Winter Universiade